Vatsala Rajagopal  (born December 25, 1933) is a former Indian actress. She started her acting career as a stage artist in 1979 and has acted in 450 plays in 25 years. She has acted in many Tamil television serials from the days when they were produced in 1990s. She has also acted in Tamil films including Roja, Sathi Leelavathi, Rhythm and Kaalamellam Kadhal Vaazhga.

Filmography

Serials

References

Tamil television actresses
Actresses in Tamil cinema
Living people
Tamil theatre
Indian film actresses
1933 births
Actresses in Telugu cinema
Indian television actresses
20th-century Indian actresses
21st-century Indian actresses